Yves Oger (13 June 1951 – 22 August 2019) was a French rower. He competed in the men's eight event at the 1972 Summer Olympics.

References

External links

1951 births
2019 deaths
French male rowers
Olympic rowers of France
Rowers at the 1972 Summer Olympics